The 2023 FEI European Dressage Championships will be held in Riesenbeck, Germany, from 4 to 10 September 2023. Other cities who bid to host the Championships were Cascais in Portugal and Vejer de la Frontera in Spain, but both cities witdrew. The FEI allocated the European Championships in Riesenbeck on the 21st of October and will count as qualification event for the Olympic Games In 2021 the European Championships for show-jumping was also organized in Riesenbeck, at the show location of Olympic gold-medalist Ludger Beerbaum.

Ground Jury
The Ground Jury during the 2023 European Dressage Championships is nominated as follows;

Ground jury panel for the Para-Dressage:
  Ulrike Nivelle (Ground Jury President)
  Kurt Christensen (Ground Jury Member)
  Michael Osinski (Ground Jury Member)
  Eduard de Wolff van Westerrode (Ground Jury Member)
  Maria Colliander (Ground Jury Member)
  Isobel Wessels (Ground Jury Member)
  Raphael Saleh (Ground Jury Member)
  Carlos Lopes (Technical Delegate)

Ground jury panel for the Para-Dressage:
  Elke Ebert (Ground Jury President)
  Ineke Jansen (Ground Jury Member)
  Sarah Leitch (Ground Jury Member)
  Eva Andersson (Ground Jury Member)
  Anne Prain (Ground Jury Member)
  Juliet Whatley (Technical Delegate)

Medalists

Dressage

Para-Dressage

References

External links
 Official site

FEI-recognized competition
European
FEI
European Dressage Championships
FEI